Son of Science are an English progressive metal band from Brighton, formed by bassist Adrian Lambert after leaving UK power metal band DragonForce. The band play a technical but catchy style of metal characterised by multiple time changes, unison guitar and keyboard solos, and heavy riffs.

Members
Lee Cassidy - guitar (2006-) (ex-The Clan Destined)
Phil Wickens - keyboards (2007-)
Adrian Lambert - bass (2006-) (ex-Intense), ex-DragonForce, Biomechanical)
Jonno Lodge - drums (2008-) (Biomechanical)
Leon Lawless - vocals (2007-) (ex-WinterHeart)

External links

 at Myspace

English progressive metal musical groups